Népliget  is a station on the M3 (North-South) line of the Budapest Metro. The station lies under the intersection of Üllői Avenue and Könyves Kálmán Boulevard, and named after the city park Népliget. Népliget is also one of the most important suburban, inter-city and international bus terminal in Budapest, was rebuilt in 2003. The station was opened on 20 April 1980 as part of the extension from Nagyvárad tér to Kőbánya-Kispest.

Connections
Bus: 254E
Regional bus: 607, 608, 626, 628, 629, 630, 631, 632, 633, 635, 636, 650, 653, 655, 656, 660, 661, 705
Trolley bus: 83M
Tram: 1, 1M

References 
Budapest City Atlas, Dimap-Szarvas, Budapest, 2011, 

M3 (Budapest Metro) stations
Railway stations opened in 1980
Transit centers in Hungary